The Thembu (abaThembu ababhuzu-bhuzu, abanisi bemvula ilanga libalele) refers to the Xhosa people who were under the Thembu Kingdom.

According to Xhosa oral tradition, the Thembu migrated along the east coast of Southern Africa before settling in KwaZulu-Natal. The earliest known Thembu ancestor is Mbulali, whose grandson (named Thembu), led his people from what became the South African province of KwaZulu-Natal to Dedesi in the present-day Transkei region of South Africa. The Thembu emerged as a unified people during the reign of Ngubengcuka, who united clans living in Thembuland into a single political entity, owing allegiance to the Thembu royal family, or "Hala Mvelase." Famous Thembus include Nelson Mandela, whose father was a reigning nobleman from a junior branch of the Madiba clan of kings, and Walter Sisulu.

Name 
In Xhosa, the name is abaThembu, (aba- is a common prefix implying "people"). The territory of the Thembu state was historically known as Thembuland.

In the 19th century, Thembu were frequently known as the "Tamboekie" or "Tambookie" people. This name was originally the Khoisan language term specifically for the followers of Chief Maphasa who moved into the area west of the Great Kei River in the 1820s. However, Europeans used these terms as a synonym for "Thembu" for much of the 19th century.

History

Prior to the British conquest in the 19th century, the Thembu had an independent kingdom. The Xhosa clan name of the Thembu kings is Ntlazi aNkosiyane. Recent kings, including Sabata Jonguhlanga Dalindyebo, took the surname Dalindyebo, after a 19th-century king.

After conquest, the Thembu came under the government of the Cape Colony as part of Transkei. With the exception of a few missionaries and traders, Transkei was a Bantustan. The Transkei remained a bantustan under apartheid, and was along with Ciskei regarded as the homeland of the Xhosa people.

King 
Buyelekhaya Dalindyebo, son of Sabata Jonguhlanga Dalindyebo, became the Thembu king in May 1989; his praise name is Zwelibanzi. Sabata deposed Kaiser Matanzima, whom the government had installed and who advocated against South African liberation movements. In December 2009, King Buyelekhaya was convicted of offenses including culpable homicide, kidnapping, arson and assault. In response, he proposed secession from South Africa, and later demanded that the government pay Dalindyebo R900 million and the tribe a further R80 billion in compensation for the humiliation caused by his criminal trial.

Dalindyebo was imprisoned in December 2015. He was customarily dethroned and was expected to be administratively dethroned.

Prince Azenathi Dalindyebo, Buyelekhaya's heir, has served as the acting king of the tribe since 2016.

On 23 December 2019, following president Cyril Ramaphosa's Day of reconciliation speech, the Abathembu King was released from prison after serving one-third of his sentence.

Lineage 

 Ndala
 1800 - 10 Aug 1830 Vusani Ngubengcuka Aa! Ndaba!
 Mthikrakra
 Ngangelizwe
 Dalindyebo
 Sampu Dalindyebo Aa! Jongilizwe!
 Sabata Dalindyebo Aa! Jonguhlanga!
 May 1989 - present Buyelekhaya Dalindyebo Aa! Zwelibanzi!

Thembu Kingship line

See also
Dalindyebo
Matanzima
Xhosa clan names

References

External links

Royal lineage at worldstatesmen.org

Nguni languages
Ethnic groups in South Africa